Al-Walid was the sixth Umayyad caliph ruling from October 705 until 715 CE.

Al-Walid may also refer to:

People 
 Khalid ibn al-Walid (592–642), one of the two famous Arab generals of the Rashidun army during the Muslim conquests of the 7th Century
 Al-Walid I (668–715), Umayyad caliph who ruled from 705 to 715
 Al-Walid II (709–744), Umayyad caliph who ruled from 743 until 744
 Muslim ibn al-Walid (748–823), poet
 Ibrahim ibn al-Walid (died 750), Umayyad caliph who ruled for a short time in 744
 Averroes (1126–1198), or Abul Walid Muhammad Ibn Aḥmad Ibn Rushd, Andalusian-Arab philosopher, physician, and polymath
 Abu al-Walid (1967–2004), Arab Mujahid who fought in both Chechen Wars
 Najiyah bint al-Walid, a sahaba of Muhammad
 Abu al-Walid al-Dahdouh (died 2006), senior leader of the Palestinian militant group Islamic Jihad
 Al-Waleed bin Talal (born 1955), member of the Saudi Royal Family
 Jonah ibn Janah (990s–1050s), important Hebrew grammarian and lexicographer of the Middle Ages
Walid ibn Utbah (died 624), son of Quraish leader Utba ibn Rabi'ah Walid ibn Utbah (died 624), son of Quraish leader Utba ibn Rabi'ah

Places 
 Al Waleed (town), a town in Anbar Province in Iraq
 Al-Waleed (camp)

See also
 Waleed, an Arabic name